In Greek mythology, Theonoe (Ancient Greek: Θεονόη means "divine wisdom" from theós 'god' and nóos or noûs 'mind') was a name that may refer to the following women:

Theonoe, daughter of the prophet Thestor, sister to Theoclymenus, Calchas and Leucippe.
 Theonoe, daughter to the Egyptian king Proteus

Notes

References 

 Euripides, The Complete Greek Drama, edited by Whitney J. Oates and Eugene O'Neill, Jr. in two volumes. 2. Helen, translated by Robert Potter. New York. Random House. 1938. Online version at the Perseus Digital Library.
 Euripides, Euripidis Fabulae. vol. 3. Gilbert Murray. Oxford. Clarendon Press, Oxford. 1913. Greek text available at the Perseus Digital Library.
 Gaius Julius Hyginus, Fabulae from The Myths of Hyginus translated and edited by Mary Grant. University of Kansas Publications in Humanistic Studies. Online version at the Topos Text Project.

Women in Greek mythology
Characters in Greek mythology